The European Athletics Indoor Championships is a biennial indoor track and field competition for European athletes that is organised by the European Athletic Association. It was held for the first time in 1970, replacing the European Indoor Games, its predecessor event first held in 1966.

The championships was an annual event until 1990, when it was changed to its current biennial format. A gap of three years occurred after the 2002 edition to synchronize the event with the other major championships of international athletics. The event is hosted by a different European city each year.

Editions

European Indoor Games

European Indoor Championships

Championship records

Men

Women

Heptathlon disciplines

Pentathlon disciplines

By country

Records in defunct events

Men's events

Women's events

† Haglund ran this time in the semifinals, and again with Popova in the final; the photofinish gave Popova first and Haglund second, with each woman being credited as having equalled the championship record.

All-time medal table
Medal table includes 1966–2023.

  Includes medal of Dragan Perić, a Serbian athlete who competed during the Yugoslav Wars as an Independent European Participant.

Multiple medallists

A total of 26 men and 24 women have won five or more medals at the competition.

Men

Women

Notes

See also
 Greece at the European Athletics Indoor Championships
 Italy at the European Athletics Indoor Championships

References

External links

Home page
European Indoor Championships (Men). GBR Athletics. Retrieved on 2012-07-10.
European Indoor Championships (Women). GBR Athletics. Retrieved on 2012-07-10.

 
Indoor
Indoor track and field competitions
Recurring sporting events established in 1970
Athletics Indoor
Continental athletics championships
Biennial athletics competitions